Zaouiat Ahansal is a small town and rural commune in Azilal Province of the Tadla-Azilal region of Morocco. At the time of the 2004 census, the commune had a total population of 10435 people living in 1554 households.

History
The town was founded in the 13th century by an Islamic traveller and scholar named Sidi Said Ahansal, whose legend was claimed that his mentor told him to establish a religious school. 

Today, the town is mostly inhabited by a group of nomadic Berber peoples, including the Aït Atta tribes.

Weekly Market 
The weekly market that draws all the people of the area is held on Mondays near Zaouiat Ahansal.

NGOs 
The Atlas Cultural Foundation and Les Amis de Amezray, based in France works closely with the people of Zaouiat Ahansal to provide developmental aid to the area.

References

Populated places in Azilal Province
Rural communes of Béni Mellal-Khénifra